Ymir Mountain is a  summit in the West Kootenay region of southeastern British Columbia, Canada.

Name origin
According to Norse mythology, Ymir was father of the giants and grandfather of Odin, king of the gods. Geologist and explorer George Dawson in his 1889 report was the first to adopt the name. Dawson also selected a Norse source in naming the Valhalla Ranges. Ymir to the southwest derives its name from the mountain.

Recreation
The Whitewater Ski Resort is located on Ymir Mountain and the surrounding peaks, Silver King Mountain and Summit Mountain, which are known collectively as the Ymir Bowl. The mountain receives large amounts of snow in the winter making for an ideal location for the ski resort.

References

Two-thousanders of British Columbia
Selkirk Mountains
Kootenay Land District
Ymir